Grapevine leafroll-associated virus 4 (GRLaV-4) is a virus infecting grapevine in the genus Ampelovirus.

References

External links 
 uniprot.org/taxonomy

Closteroviridae
Viral grape diseases